Turbonilla whiteavesi is a species of sea snail, a marine gastropod mollusk in the family Pyramidellidae, the pyrams and their allies.

Distribution
This species occurs in the following locations:
 North West Atlantic

Notes
Additional information regarding this species:
 Distribution: Shediac Bay and Prince Edward Island (from the northern tip of Miscou Island, N.B. to Cape Breton Island south of Chéticamp, including the Northumberland Strait and St. George's Bay to the Canso Causeway)
 Habitat: infralittoral of the Gulf and estuary

References

External links
 To Encyclopedia of Life
 To USNM Invertebrate Zoology Mollusca Collection
 To ITIS
 To World Register of Marine Species

whiteavesi
Gastropods described in 1909